Amir Mohammad Bakhshi Kalhori (born 2 December 1999) is an Iranian taekwondo competitor. He won a silver medal at the 2018 Asian Games and a gold medal at the 2018 Asian Championships in the 68 kg event.

References 

Iranian male taekwondo practitioners
1999 births
Living people
Asian Games silver medalists for Iran
Asian Games medalists in taekwondo
Taekwondo practitioners at the 2018 Asian Games
Medalists at the 2018 Asian Games
Universiade gold medalists for Iran
Universiade medalists in taekwondo
Medalists at the 2019 Summer Universiade
Asian Taekwondo Championships medalists
People from Mianeh
20th-century Iranian people
21st-century Iranian people
Islamic Solidarity Games competitors for Iran